The Department of Industry was an Australian government department that existed between 1928 and 1940.

Scope
The department dealt with the matters raised by unions on industrial matters and matters related to the administration of the Cockatoo Island Dockyard.

All of the Department's positions were abolished in 1932 and the Department was virtually inactive.

Structure
The Department was a Commonwealth Public Service department, staffed by officials who were responsible to the Minister for Industry.

References

Industry
Ministries established in 1928
1928 establishments in Australia
1940 disestablishments in Australia